Leland Stanford Kollmorgen (born May 20, 1927)  is a retired rear admiral in the United States Navy. He served as Chief of Naval Research  from 1981 to 1983.

Kollmorgen is a 1951 graduate of the United States Naval Academy. He later earned a master's degree in Foreign Affairs from George Washington University in 1966.

Kollmorgen later commanded both VA-165 and VA-128.

Kollmorgen served as the military assistant to President Gerald Ford from April 1975 to June 1976.

References

1927 births
Living people
United States Naval Academy alumni
United States Naval Aviators
United States Navy personnel of the Vietnam War
Recipients of the Distinguished Flying Cross (United States)
George Washington University alumni
Recipients of the Silver Star
United States Navy admirals